Adam Campbell may refer to:

Adam Campbell (actor) (born 1980), English actor
Adam Campbell (Australian footballer) (born 1985), Australian rules footballer
Adam Campbell (footballer, born 1995), English association footballer
Adam Campbell (politician), Canadian political candidate for the district of Vegreville—Wainwright in 2008